Winfield is a ghost town in Chaffee County, Colorado, United States.  It is estimated that as many as 1,500 people may have lived in Winfield.

A marker on site reads "Winfield, at the junction of the north and south forks of Clear Creek, started off with some confusion, as shown in this article from the Chaffee County Times, August 12, 1881: 'Lucknow is the name given to the old town of Florence. Winfield is the name of the post office, so that it is a much named town. The town site, comprising 120 acres, was taken up by P. H. Symon, G. L. Brown, J. S. Sharpe, Dr. J. J. Smith, L. W. Clark and Thomas Leasure. It is laid off into lots of 50x100 which are free to all desiring to build. No soulless corporation about that.' A cabin was built at Winfield as early as 1861 and some prospecting was done in the area in 1867, but Winfield reached its heyday in 1890 with an estimated population of fifteen hundred. At its prime, Winfield included three saloons, three stores, a post office, two hotels, a boarding house, mill, smelter, concentrator, church and a school, which is now a museum containing school furnishings and displays. This museum is restored and operated by the Clear Creek Historical Society of Chaffee County. The Ball cabin across the street from the school house is also a museum of the mining era. The Silver market crash in 1893 halted the mining activity in Clear Creek Canyon. There was a resumption in the early 1900s; the last ore was hauled out of the canyon by two-horse stage in 1918."

See also

 National Register of Historic Places listings in Chaffee County, Colorado
 List of ghost towns in Colorado

References

Ghost towns in Colorado
Former populated places in Chaffee County, Colorado
Tourist attractions in Chaffee County, Colorado